Grace McKeaney is an American television writer, playwright and educator.

She attended Northwestern University and starred as Blanche DuBois in A Streetcar Named Desire by Tennessee Williams. She obtained an MFA in playwriting from the Yale School of Drama.

In Baltimore, she was a teacher to elementary and junior high classes. She also taught a course in playwriting at Northwestern University.

Even though she has written television episodes of Roseanne,  St. Elsewhere, The Client, The Hoop Life and The Education of Max Bickford, she considers herself primarily a playwright.

She married actor John Getz in 1987.  They divorced in 1996.  They have one child together, Hannah Getz, a cinematographer.

References

External links
 

American dramatists and playwrights
American television producers
American women television producers
American television writers
Northwestern University School of Communication alumni
Yale School of Drama alumni
American women television writers
American women dramatists and playwrights
Living people
Place of birth missing (living people)
Year of birth missing (living people)
21st-century American women